Justin Lock is an American meteorologist for the Charleston, South Carolina TV Station, WCSC-TV. He first started at KHAS-TV in Hastings, Nebraska. Then he made his way to Charleston to WCIV-TV as an anchor on Lowcountry Live. After that, he was in Philadelphia, Pennsylvania, on CN8 The Comcast Network. He then went to the WGCL-TV in Atlanta, Georgia, and boosted their morning show, Better Mornings Atlanta, while he was a Weather/Traffic anchor. He now is in Charleston at WCSC-TV.

Lock graduated from Ohio State University in 2001 with a Bachelor of Science degree in meteorology. He has chased tornadoes in Nebraska, lived through several landfalling hurricanes in Charleston, South Carolina, and forecasted countless nor'easters in Philadelphia, Pennsylvania.

Lock began his career in 2001 doing morning weather in Hastings, Nebraska, on KHAS-TV with other stints in Charleston on WWCIV-TV and Philadelphia on CN8.

In June 2011 Lock won his first Emmy Award for best On-Air Meteorologist in the Southeastern United States.

Lock is also a member of the American Meteorological Society and has earned the Certified Broadcast Meteorologist seal (CBM), the highest certification in his field.

Lock resides in Mount Pleasant, South Carolina, with his wife and newborn son and his two dogs.

References 
 Justin Lock bio. CBS Atlanta TV.

External links
 Justin Lock at LinkedIn
 https://web.archive.org/web/20130712160738/http://www.live5news.com/story/21101049/justin-lock

Year of birth missing (living people)
Living people
American meteorologists